Estádio da Ponte Grande was a São Paulo, Brazil-based football stadium owned by São Paulo sports club Corinthians.

History
The club's players and fans managed to build a new stadium for the club in 1918, and Corinthians would play at the Estádio da Ponte Grande for nine years.

Defunct football venues in Brazil
Football venues in São Paulo
Football venues in São Paulo (state)
Sport Club Corinthians Paulista